Stonington may refer to:

Places
Antarctica
Stonington Island, Marguerite Bay

United States
Stonington, Connecticut (town)
Stonington (borough), Connecticut (incorporated borough)
Stonington, Illinois
Stonington, Indiana
Stonington, Maine
Stonington, Michigan

See also
 Stonnington (disambiguation)